Anas Tahiri (born 15 May 1995) is a professional footballer who plays as a midfielder for Eredivisie club SC Heerenveen. Born in Belgium, he represented Morocco at youth international level.

Club career
Tahiri registered his Belgian Pro League debut for Lierse on 16 March 2014, aged 18, by replacing Ahmed El Messaoudi in the 87th minute of a 2–1 home defeat to Lokeren. He played 63 games and scored five times during his stint at the Lier-based club, before moving to the Netherlands with RKC Waalwijk in the summer of 2018.

Tahiri contributed with 39 appearances and two goals in the 2018–19 season, as RKC Waalwijk achieved promotion to the Eredivise; He made his debut in the latter competition on 3 August 2019, in a 3–1 away loss to VVV-Venlo, and netted his first goal two weeks later in a 3–3 draw with Twente.

On 10 June 2021, he changed countries again after agreeing to a contract with CFR Cluj in Romania.

On 7 January 2022, Tahiri returned to the Netherlands and signed a 2.5-year contract with SC Heerenveen.

International career
Tahiri earned his first cap for the Morocco national under-23 team in a friendly 1–0 win against Cameroon, on 5 June 2016.

Honours

RKC Waalwijk
Eerste Divisie play-off winner : 2018–19 Eerste Divisie

CFR Cluj
Liga I: 2021–22
Supercupa României runner-up: 2021

References

External links

1995 births
Living people
Footballers from Brussels
Belgian sportspeople of Moroccan descent
Belgian footballers
Moroccan footballers
Association football midfielders
Eredivisie players
Eerste Divisie players
Belgian Pro League players
Challenger Pro League players
Liga I players
Lierse S.K. players
RKC Waalwijk players
CFR Cluj players
SC Heerenveen players 
Moroccan expatriate footballers
Belgian expatriate footballers
Moroccan expatriate sportspeople in the Netherlands
Belgian expatriate sportspeople in the Netherlands
Expatriate footballers in the Netherlands
Moroccan expatriate sportspeople in Romania
Belgian expatriate sportspeople in Romania
Expatriate footballers in Romania